Robert Duncan Wilmot Jr. (July 17, 1837 – January 7, 1920) was a Canadian farmer, businessman and politician.

Born in Liverpool, England, where his father, Robert Duncan Wilmot, was working in the family shipbuilding business from 1835 to 1840, Wilmot was educated in Saint John, New Brunswick, and the Sunbury County Grammar School. In 1867, he married Elizabeth W. Black. He was a member of the Sunbury Municipal Council and Warden of the County. Wilmot also served as lieutenant colonel in the militia. He ran unsuccessfully for a seat in the provincial assembly in 1886. He was first elected to the House of Commons of Canada for the riding of Sunbury in the 1887 federal election. A Conservative, he was re-elected in 1891 but was defeated in the 1896 federal election and in an 1896 by-election. He was elected again in the 1900 election for the riding of Sunbury—Queen's and in 1904. He was defeated in 1908.

References
 The Canadian Parliament; biographical sketches and photo-engravures of the senators and members of the House of Commons of Canada. Being the tenth Parliament, elected November 3, 1904
The Canadian parliamentary companion, 1891 JA Gemmill

External links
 

1837 births
1920 deaths
Conservative Party of Canada (1867–1942) MPs
Members of the House of Commons of Canada from New Brunswick